Scoparius, Latin for sweeper, may refer to:
 Cytisus scoparius, a perennial, leguminous shrub
 Lotus scoparius, a perennial subshrub
 Rhinacanthus scoparius, a species of plant endemic to Yemen

See also
Scoparia (disambiguation)